Okahenge is a village in the Ohangwena Region of Namibia in the Engela Constituency. 

Villages in Namibia
Ohangwena Region